Ithycythara funicostata is a species of sea snail, a marine gastropod mollusk in the family Mangeliidae.

Description

Distribution
This species occurs in the Western Gulf of Thailand.

References

 Robba E., Di Geronimo I., Chaimanee N., Pietro Negri M. & Sanfilippo R. 2007. Holocene and Recent shallow soft-bottom mollusks from the Western Gulf of Thailand: Pak Phanang Bay and additions to Phetchaburi fauna. Bollettino Malacologico 42 (supplement 6): 1-98
 Bouchet, P.; Fontaine, B. (2009). List of new marine species described between 2002-2006. Census of Marine Life.

External links

funicostata
Gastropods described in 2007